Lysicles may refer to:
 Lysicles (5th century BC) (d. 428 BC), Athenian general, contemporary of Pericles
 Lysicles (4th century BC) (d. 338 BC), Athenian commander at the battle of Chaeronea
 Lysicles (phasmid), a genus of stick insects in the family Phasmatidae